Gonora is a genus of moths in the family Geometridae. They occur in South America.

Species
There are four or five species:

References

Ennominae
Geometridae genera
Moths of South America
Taxa named by Francis Walker (entomologist)